Bar Rud or Barrud may refer to:
 Bar Rud, Ahmadi, Hormozgan Province
 Barrud, Fareghan, Hormozgan Province
 Bar Rud, Razavi Khorasan
 Bar Rud, Fariman, Razavi Khorasan Province
 Barrud Rural District, in Razavi Khorasan Province